Laetitia, deriving from the root word laeta, meaning "happy", "glad", "lucky", "successful", "prosperous", "luxurious", "lush", or "abounding", was a minor Roman goddess of gaiety. Her name was used to mean happiness with prosperity and abundance. She is usually shown with greenery to depict the abundance of seasonal decorations that many sites would include. Wreaths of flowers or leaves are commonly worn at festivals or holy rituals, similarly Laetitia would be shown wearing a garland to mean celebration. She was sometimes depicted on Roman coinage with an anchor, as a representation of stability, or, like Fortuna, a ship's rudder symbolizing her guiding one to good fortune or prosperity.

Laetitia, engraved Felicitas Temporum, the happiness of the times, has children playing across the four seasons on different coins, the limes denarus holds Laetitia at an altar sacrificing near lit candles while the back features a half-moon and seven stars. Coins of the limes denarus are issued by Elagabalus, this meant they were indicating the divine, at behest of Septimius Severus. Saecvli Felicitas, the happiness of the age, happiness followed abundance and the virtue of Roman and Egyptian destiny whole and by necessity included large stores of grain imported from Egypt, with some coins showing Laetitia having an infant Horus suckling at her breast, it could mean Roman-Egyptian ancient goddess Isis may have been prominent in Rome at the time, further coins reveal children on the throne, and an emperor with a spear and orb.  The trade in surplus foodstuffs was a sign of wealth, used symbolically with the child Plutus, the virtue of abundance is food and prosperity for all of society, food precedes and may follow prosperity. A new lineage is born of abundance, this is a joy depicted on the following coins and the beliefs of Romans where suggested similarly to be joyful of their new heirs. Laetitia Publicae, "the happiness of the times", produced and preceded "the happiness of the age" and it founded a "Established" joy. Roman and Egyptian destiny is made complete and altered to make anew, this is necessary for Established joy.

Roman Laetitia publ, or Publius, most likely meaning Publius Vellaeus, the commander of the provincial army in Moesia in otherwise unknown activities of Roman administrators and Moesian army officers in the period in AD21, and Laetita Fvndat, or fundat, now personified by a rudder next a globe, symbolically means trade is now part of the globe, the sea routes which now transport more food, corn. A rudder is also shown behind an altar, as such a divine victory and gain of food through the sea is establishing a joy that is public, a public joy is a religious thanksgiving.

Also named Laetitia Fundata, after 3rd century CE under Augustus, Laetitia Fundata means "Established" or "Well-Founded" Joy; these coins usually show Her with a ship's rudder, often resting on a globe. Again, these depictions hammer home the idea that the foundation of the Empire's happiness was built on its ability to dominate and direct the course of events, though they may also, more practically, make reference to the Empire's dependence on imported grain to keep its people fed. Goddess Ceres is shown with her daughter Proserpina (perhaps better known by their Greek equivalents Demeter and Kore or Persephone), under Emperor Pius rule instead of Laetitia. She is also depicted with ears of wheat in Her right hand; but in Her left She holds the hasta pura, literally a "blameless spear", a prized military award for saving the life of a soldier. A symbol of divine power the hasta pura was also carried by the Goddesses Pax ("Peace") and Providentia ("Providence" or "Foresight"), indicates righteous victory, or the peace and prosperity that can flourish when a war is won. Laetitia, or more accurately, a "groundless" version of Her is mentioned by Ovid in his Metamorphoses as being a friend of the Rumor-Goddess Fama; in this case, Laetitia represents the unfounded joy gossip can quickly bring and just as quickly dash.

See also 
39 Laetitia
Ludi saeculares
The Roman deity, Saturnalia
Tyche

References 

Roman goddesses
Personifications in Roman mythology